Church of the Resurrection in Katowice is a neo-Roman Evangelical-Augsburg church in the Śródmieście district, Katowice, Poland. It was built in the years 1856–1858 and was the first masonry church in Katowice.

Further reading
Ewangelicki kościół Zmartwychwstania Pańskiego w Katowicach. 150-lecie poświęcenia kościoła (red. J. Szturc), Wyd. "Głos Życia", Katowice 2008.

Resurrection
Katowice Resurrection
Katowice Resurrection
Katowice Resurrection
Katowice Resurrection
Romanesque Revival church buildings
Katowice Resurrection
19th-century churches in Poland